The 1980–81 Yugoslav Ice Hockey League season was the 39th season of the Yugoslav Ice Hockey League, the top level of ice hockey in Yugoslavia. Eight teams participated in the league, and Jesenice have won the championship.

Regular season

External links
Season on hokej.snt.cz

Yugoslav
Yugoslav Ice Hockey League seasons
1980–81 in Yugoslav ice hockey